Chiró Vuza N'Toko Mena (born 30 January 1988), known as Chiró N'Toko, is a footballer who plays as a centre back. He most recently played for El Paso Locomotive in the USL Championship.

Club career

AGOVV 
N'Toko came to AGOVV in the summer of 2007 as a replacement for Dennis van der Ree who had moved to SC Cambuur. Although his primary position is centre back he succeeded as right back for AGOVV in his first season. In his second season at AGOVV he became a regular in the first squad, and was considered one of the best defenders of the Eerste Divisie. In his third season N'Toko was placed in the centre back position due to the breakthrough of fellow AGOVV-player Ramon Leeuwin. At the end of the 2009–10 season N'Toko was released from his contract in search for a new challenge.

ADO Den Haag 
In the winter of 2011, N'Toko was signed by former AGOVV-manager John van den Brom until the summer of 2013. He played his first game for the club as a substitute in the 0–1 away win against PSV as a substitute from Dmitri Bulykin. On 13 March 2012, N'Toko suffered a serious knee injury and was out for the remainder of the season. N'Toko was released at the end of the 2011–12 season.

Barnet 
N'Toko joined Barnet on 15 February 2013, and made his debut when he started in a 2–1 win at York City a day later. Following Barnet's relegation at the end of the season N'Toko was released by the club.

Later career 
In July 2013, N'Toko signed a two-year deal with FC Eindhoven. After three seasons as a key player for the club, he joined Cambuur on 22 June 2016. He played 13 matches before joining NAC Breda on 9 January 2017.

In September 2018, N'Toko moved to Slovak Super Liga club FK Senica. He then joined USL Championship club El Paso Locomotive in November 2018. He grew into a team captain at the club. He suffered a season-ending injury in the summer of 2020 and was subsequently not included in the roster.

References

External links

 
 Voetbal International profile 
 

1988 births
Living people
Footballers from Kinshasa
Democratic Republic of the Congo footballers
Belgian footballers
Belgian expatriate footballers
AGOVV Apeldoorn players
ADO Den Haag players
Barnet F.C. players
FC Eindhoven players
SC Cambuur players
NAC Breda players
FK Senica players
El Paso Locomotive FC players
Eredivisie players
Eerste Divisie players
English Football League players
Expatriate footballers in the Netherlands
Expatriate footballers in England
Association football central defenders
USL Championship players
Expatriate footballers in Slovakia
Democratic Republic of the Congo expatriate footballers
Democratic Republic of the Congo expatriate sportspeople in Slovakia
Democratic Republic of the Congo expatriate sportspeople in the Netherlands
Democratic Republic of the Congo expatriate sportspeople in England
Democratic Republic of the Congo expatriate sportspeople in the United States
Belgian expatriate sportspeople in the Netherlands
Belgian expatriate sportspeople in England
Belgian expatriate sportspeople in Slovakia
Belgian expatriate sportspeople in the United States
21st-century Democratic Republic of the Congo people